Carex speciosa is a tussock-forming species of perennial sedge in the family Cyperaceae. It is native to part of Asia and Malesia.

See also
List of Carex species

References

speciosa
Plants described in 1837
Taxa named by Carl Sigismund Kunth
Flora of Indonesia
Flora of India
Flora of Vietnam
Flora of Thailand
Flora of Assam (region)
Flora of Bangladesh
Flora of Borneo
Flora of Cambodia
Flora of China
Flora of Java
Flora of Laos
Flora of Malaysia
Flora of Nepal
Flora of Sumatra